Herbert Wessel (born 12 March 1943) is a German athlete. He competed in the men's decathlon at the 1968 Summer Olympics.

References

External links
 

1943 births
Living people
Athletes (track and field) at the 1968 Summer Olympics
German decathletes
Olympic athletes of East Germany
Sportspeople from Königsberg